Pembroke Private Wealth Management  is a division of Pembroke Management Ltd., a privately held Canadian investment management firm that manages the Pembroke family of Mutual Funds and Pooled Funds, and Separately Managed Accounts for Canadian pension funds, foundations, endowments, wealthy families and individuals.

Since Pembroke's founding in 1968, the portfolio management team has applied fundamental analysis and conducted ongoing executive level interviews to attempt to identify high quality companies with compelling growth prospects, unrecognized intrinsic value, and strong entrepreneurial leadership.

The Great Britain and Canada Investment Corporation, now known as the GBC American Growth Fund Inc., incorporated in 1929, and has been managed by Pembroke Management since 1968. To expand and diversify the investment strategies the firm offers while unifying all funds under the same umbrella, the firm created the Pembroke family of Mutual Funds and the Pembroke family of Pooled Funds.

Pembroke Private Wealth Management is a mutual fund manager and dealer for the Pembroke family of Mutual Funds and the Pembroke family of Pooled Funds, as well as a discretionary account manager for accounts $5,000,000 and larger.

History

1929 - The Great Britain and Canada Investment Corporation, now known as the GBC American Growth Fund Inc., was incorporated in March. $11,000,000 was raised through the efforts of Nesbitt Thomson, Govett Sons & Co. and Iselin & Co. Pembroke has managed the assets since 1968
1968 - Pembroke Management Ltd. was founded in September by Neil B. Ivory, Clifford L. Larock, A. Scott Taylor and Ian A. Soutar to manage some of the funds previously managed by Arbuckle Govett. The firm’s name is a reference to Pembroke College, Cambridge.
1970 - The Pembroke Fund Ltd. was launched.
1988 - GBC Asset Management Inc. was founded. GBC North America converted from a closed end fund to a mutual fund. Ivory & Sime Pembroke was formed by Pembroke Management and Ivory and Sime PLC. to market the GBC family of mutual funds in Canada and the UK. The funds were launched on November 1.
2007 - Elizabeth B. Dawson was appointed President and Director of GBC Asset Management. 
2010 - Pembroke Private Wealth Management was founded to provide discretionary account services to clients with accounts of $5,000,000 and greater.
2011 - Pembroke Private Wealth Management and GBC Asset Management are consolidated under the Pembroke banner in order to streamline services offered to private clients.
2020 - All GBC Mutual Fund and Pooled Funds were renamed under the Pembroke banner.

References

External links
 "Pembroke Private Wealth Management", Canadian Business Journal, October 2011 
Rob Carrick "A mutual fund family worth knowing about", The Globe and Mail, September 28, 2010
Simon Avery "Fixated on the Fed" The Globe and Mail, October 10, 2010
Shirley Won "Betting on a North American Recovery" The Globe and Mail, December 8, 2010
Linkedin
Facebook
Company website

Financial services companies established in 1929
Investment management companies of Canada
1929 establishments in Ontario